Wusappaning?! is an EP by the Orange County, California rock band Home Grown, released in 1996 by Burning Heart Records. The EP was later released in the United States in 1998 by Cargo Music/Grilled Cheese. 

The song "Another Face in the Crowd" is a re-recording of "Face in the Crowd" from the band's debut album That's Business.  The song "We Are Dumb" was featured on the soundtrack for the 1998 comedy-thriller film Homegrown and stoner comedy Half Baked.

Track listing
"We Are Dumb" (Tran)
"Shirley D. Pressed" (Tran)
"Hanging Out" (Tran)
"More Than Friends" (Lohrbach)
"Another Face in the Crowd" (Tran)

Performers
John "Johnee Trash" Tran - vocals, guitar
Ian "Slur" Cone - vocals, guitar
Adam "Adumb" Lohrbach - vocals, bass
Bob "Stress" Herco - drums

Album information
Record label: Burning Heart Records
Produced and engineered by Jim Barnes and Home Grown
Recorded and mixed at Jim Barnes Audio Productions January 1996
Layout by Mean Street Graphics
Artwork by Ron Ruvalvcava Jr.

References 

Home Grown albums
1996 EPs
Burning Heart Records EPs